Road 72 is a transit road connecting southwest Iran to central Iran. It passes Borujen, Mountainous areas of Zagros, Karun 3 dam, Izeh, Baghmalek and Ramhormoz then it goes into Road 86 and reaches Ahvaz. It is within Isfahan Province, Chaharmahal and Bakhtiari Province, and Khuzestan Province.

References

External links 

 Iran road map on Young Journalists Club

72
Transportation in Isfahan Province
Transportation in Chaharmahal and Bakhtiari Province
Transportation in Khuzestan Province